Gharsallah (غرس الله, lit. "plant of God; seed of God"), is a Tunisian surname.
Gharsallah, la semence de Dieu, 2007 documentary about a Tunisian man of this name
Disappearance of Georgina Gharsallah, 2018 disappearance case in West Sussex, UK
Karim Gharsallah, Tunisian Paralympics table tennis player, see Tunisia at the 2020 Summer Paralympics
Amin Gharsallah, Tunisian rugby player, see 2009 end-of-year rugby union internationals
Kadir Gharsallah, character in a 20098 Dutch movie, see Cahit Ölmez (actor)

Arabic-language surnames